Otis Smith III (born October 22, 1965) is an American football coach and former cornerback, and currently defensive coordinator of the Helvetic Guards.

Early years
Smith attended East Jefferson High School in the late 1980s.

Professional career
Originally signed with the Philadelphia Eagles as a rookie free agent in 1990. He spent five seasons with the team before joining the New York Jets in 1995. He signed with the New England Patriots in 1996, starting nine games, including the playoffs and Super Bowl XXXI loss to the Green Bay Packers. During his first stint with the Patriots, Smith was perhaps best remembered by Patriots fans for recovering a fumble in the 1996 AFC Title Game against the Jaguars. Smith returned it 47 yards for a touchdown, which made the score 20–6 and effectively put the game away, pushing the Patriots to their second ever Super Bowl appearance.

He rejoined the Jets in 1997 and was re-signed by New England just before the 2000 season. Smith was a contributor to the Patriots winning the Super Bowl XXXVI in 2002, when his interception set up a key field goal against the St. Louis Rams.

The last team he played for was the Detroit Lions in the 2003 season.

He retired as a member of the New England Patriots on May 18, 2005.

Coaching career
Smith agreed to join Andy Reid's staff in Philadelphia in January 2008 as an assistant secondary coach for the Eagles. It is similar to a position he held in New England as a member of the Patriots organization as part of the NFL's minority coaching fellowship program.

On June 17, 2009, an Eagles spokesperson confirmed that Smith would not be returning as an Eagles assistant for the 2009 season.

On February 1, 2010 the Kansas City Chiefs announced that Smith would join their staff as defensive quality control coach.

On June 12, 2019, Smith was named DB coach for the Los Angeles Wildcats.

On September 2, 2022, Smith became the defensive coordinator for European League of Football team Zürich Helvetic Guards.<ref>

References

External links
Philadelphia Eagles bio page

1965 births
East Jefferson High School alumni
American football cornerbacks
American expatriate sportspeople in Switzerland
Detroit Lions players
Living people
Los Angeles Wildcats coaches
Missouri Tigers football players
New England Patriots players
New York Jets players
Philadelphia Eagles coaches
Philadelphia Eagles players
Players of American football from New Orleans